A rotten egg is an egg that is no longer safe to eat. It may refer to:

Rotten Egg Nebula, a name for the Calabash Nebula
Vrot Eier, an Afrikaner game similar to Duck, duck, goose

See also

Hydrogen sulfide, a compound which smells of rotten eggs
Rottenegg (disambiguation)